Sean Michael Park (born 24 April 1980) is a South African born English cricketer.  Park is a right-handed batsman who bowls right-arm medium pace and who fields as a wicket-keeper.  He was born at Umtata, Transkei and educated at Eshowe High School, Kwazulu-Natal.

Park made his debut for Cambridgeshire in the 2008 MCCA Knockout Trophy against Lincolnshire.  In that same season he made his debut in the Minor Counties Championship against Hertfordshire.  To date, he has made nine Minor Counties Championship and ten MCCA Knockout Trophy appearances.  In 2010, Park signed for the Unicorns to take part in the 2010 Clydesdale Bank 40, a team formed of players without current full-time contracts with one of the regular first-class counties.  He made his List A debut during the competition against Glamorgan, with Park making seven further appearances in the competition.  In his eight appearances for the Unicorns, he scored a total of 62 runs at an average of 10.33, with a high score of 21.

Park now teaches at The Perse School, Cambridge alongside fellow sportsman Glenn Kirkham.

His brothers, Garry and Craig, are both first-class cricketers.

References

External links
Sean Park at ESPNcricinfo
Sean Park at CricketArchive

1980 births
Living people
People from Mthatha
English sportspeople of South African descent
English cricketers
Cambridgeshire cricketers
Unicorns cricketers
Wicket-keepers
Cricketers from the Eastern Cape
South African expatriate sportspeople in England
South African cricketers